Juraj Filip is a Slovak sprint canoer who competed in the mid-1990s. He won a bronze medal in the C-4 500 m event at the 1994 ICF Canoe Sprint World Championships in Mexico City.

References

Living people
Slovak male canoeists
Year of birth missing (living people)
ICF Canoe Sprint World Championships medalists in Canadian